David Peter Beddall (born 27 November 1948) is a former Australian politician.

Beddall was born in Manchester, England and was employed by the Commonwealth Bank and was a self-employed commercial finance consultant before he entered parliament.  He was elected as Australian Labor Party member in the Australian House of Representatives for the seat of Fadden at the 1983 election, and then for the seat of Rankin at the 1984 election.

In April 1990, he was appointed Minister for Small Business and Customs in the Hawke ministry (Minister for Small Business, Construction and Customs from December 1991).  In March 1993, he was appointed junior Communications Minister (serving concurrently with senior Communications Minister Bob Collins) in the second Keating Ministry.  As Communications Minister, Beddall launched SBS television and Triple J radio across different parts of Australia, and took the early steps in Telstra's Future Mode of Operation digital transformation.

In December 1993, he and Collins left the Communications portfolio, which was taken by Michael Lee, and Beddall replaced Lee as Minister For Resources. Beddall lost that portfolio with the defeat of the Keating government at the 1996 election, in which he was one of only two Labor MPs returned from Queensland.  He retired from parliament at the 1998 election.

Notes

Australian Labor Party members of the Parliament of Australia
Members of the Australian House of Representatives for Fadden
Members of the Australian House of Representatives for Rankin
Members of the Australian House of Representatives
1948 births
Living people
20th-century Australian politicians
Government ministers of Australia